In Riemannian geometry, a branch of mathematics, harmonic coordinates are a certain kind of coordinate chart on a smooth manifold, determined by a Riemannian metric on the manifold. They are useful in many problems of geometric analysis due to their regularity properties.

In two dimensions, certain harmonic coordinates known as isothermal coordinates have been studied since the early 1800s. Harmonic coordinates in higher dimensions were developed initially in the context of Lorentzian geometry and general relativity by Albert Einstein and Cornelius Lanczos (see harmonic coordinate condition). Following the work of Dennis DeTurck and Jerry Kazdan in 1981, they began to play a significant role in the geometric analysis literature, although Idzhad Sabitov and S.Z. Šefel had made the same discovery five years earlier.

Definition
Let  be a Riemannian manifold of dimension . That is, one requires that

where  is the Laplace–Beltrami operator. Trivially, the coordinate system is harmonic if and only if, as a map , the coordinates are a harmonic map. A direct computation with the local definition of the Laplace-Beltrami operator shows that  is a harmonic coordinate chart if and only if

Relative to a fixed "background" coordinate chart ,  one can view  as a collection of functions  on an open subset of Euclidean space. So both definitions of harmonic coordinates, as given above, have the qualitative character of having to do with second-order partial differential equations for the coordinate functions.

Using the definition of the Christoffel symbols, the above formula is equivalent to

Existence and basic theory
Harmonic coordinates always exist (locally), a result which follows easily from standard results on the existence and regularity of solutions of elliptic partial differential equations.

The basic regularity theorem concerning the metric in harmonic coordinates is that if the components of the metric are in the Hölder space  when expressed in some coordinate chart, regardless of the smoothnness of the chart itself, then the transition function from that coordinate chart to any harmonic coordinate chart will be in the Hölder space . In particular this implies that the metric will also be in  relative to harmonic coordinate charts.

As was first discovered by Cornelius Lanczos in 1922, relative to a harmonic coordinate chart, the Ricci curvature is given by

So, by the previous result,  will be  in harmonic coordinate charts.

As a further application of Lanczos' formula, it follows that an Einstein metric is analytic in harmonic coordinates. In particular, this shows that any Einstein metric on a smooth manifold automatically determines an analytic structure on the manifold, given by the collection of harmonic coordinate charts.

Due to the above analysis, in discussing harmonic coordinates it is standard to consider Riemannian metrics which are at least twice-continuously differentiable. However, with the use of more exotic function spaces, the above results on existence and regularity of harmonic coordinates can be extended to settings where the metric has very weak regularity.

Harmonic coordinates in asymptotically flat spaces
Harmonic coordinates were used by Robert Bartnik to understand the geometric properties of asymptotically flat Riemannian manifolds.

Bartnik's primary result is that the collection of asymptotically flat coordinates (if nonempty) has a simple asymptotic structure, in that the transition function between any two asymptotically flat coordinates is approximated, near infinity, by an affine transformation. This is significant in establishing that the ADM energy of an asymptotically flat Riemannian manifold is a geometric invariant which does not depend on a choice of asymptotically flat coordinates.

Then, given any asymptotically flat coordinates , from the fact that

which decays at infinity, it follows from the Fredholm theory that there are functions  which decay at infinity such that , and hence that  are harmonic. This provides the desired asymptotically flat harmonic coordinates.

Bartnik's work is predicated on the existence of asymptotically flat coordinates. Building upon his methods, Shigetoshi Bando, Atsushi Kasue, and Hiraku Nakajima showed that the decay of the curvature in terms of the distance from a point, together with polynomial growth of the volume of large geodesic balls and the simple-connectivity of their complements, implies the existence of asymptotically flat coordinates. The essential point is that their geometric assumptions, via some of the results discussed below on harmonic radius, give good control over harmonic coordinates on regions near infinity. By the use of a partition of unity, these harmonic coordinates can be patched together to form a single coordinate chart, which is the main objective.

Harmonic radius
Various authors have found versions of such "harmonic radius" estimates, both before and after Anderson's work. The essential aspect of the proof is the analysis, via standard methods of elliptic partial differential equations, for the Lanczos formula for the Ricci curvature in a harmonic coordinate chart.

So, loosely speaking, the use of harmonic coordinates show that Riemannian manifolds can be covered by coordinate charts in which the local representations of the Riemannian metric are controlled only by the qualitative geometric behavior of the Riemannian manifold itself. Following ideas set forth by Jeff Cheeger in 1970, one can then consider sequences of Riemannian manifolds which are uniformly geometrically controlled, and using the coordinates, one can assemble a "limit" Riemannian manifold. Due to the nature of such "Riemannian convergence", it follows, for instance, that up to diffeomorphism there are only finitely many smooth manifolds of a given dimension which admit Riemannian metrics with a fixed bound on Ricci curvature and diameter, with a fixed positive lower bound on injectivity radius.

Such estimates on harmonic radius are also used to construct geometrically-controlled cutoff functions, and hence partitions of unity as well. For instance, to control the second covariant derivative of a function by a locally defined second partial derivative, it is necessary to control the first derivative of the local representation of the metric. Such constructions are fundamental in studying the basic aspects of Sobolev spaces on noncompact Riemannian manifolds.

References

Footnotes

Textbooks

Articles
 
 

 
 

Harmonic functions
Riemannian geometry